Marie-Lyne Joseph (born 3 September 1982 in Guadeloupe) is a retired track and field athlete who represented Dominica.

She competed at the  2004 Summer Olympic Games in the women's 800 metres where she finished seventh in her heat so failing to advance.

References

1982 births
Living people
Dominica female middle-distance runners
Olympic athletes of Dominica
Athletes (track and field) at the 2004 Summer Olympics